Marian Calafeteanu (born 8 November 1965) is a retired Romanian football midfielder.

References

1965 births
Living people
Romanian footballers
Liga I players
Israeli Premier League players
CS Universitatea Craiova players
Hapoel Be'er Sheva F.C. players
Hapoel Bat Yam F.C. players
Maccabi Ironi Ashdod F.C. players
Association football midfielders
Romanian expatriate footballers
Expatriate footballers in Israel
Romanian expatriate sportspeople in Israel
Sportspeople from Craiova